Juan Diego Nelson (26 May 1891 – 7 August 1985 in Buenos Aires, Argentina) was an Olympic Argentinian polo player during the first half of the 20th century. He is listed in the Argentinian polo team roster for the 1924 Summer Olympics which won the gold medal that year. In the 1936 Summer Olympics, although he was once again part of the team Nelson is not listed as a medallist; he was the 'non-playing captain' of the team. Nevertheless, it is sometimes implied that Nelson was the first Argentinian to have won two Olympic gold medals. In 2008, Javier Mascherano became the second Argentine to win two Olympic gold medals.

References

1891 births
1985 deaths
Argentine people of British descent
Argentine polo players
Olympic gold medalists for Argentina
Olympic polo players of Argentina
Polo players at the 1924 Summer Olympics
Roehampton Trophy
Medalists at the 1936 Summer Olympics
Medalists at the 1924 Summer Olympics
Olympic medalists in polo